Boonea jadisi is a species of sea snail, a marine gastropod mollusk in the family Pyramidellidae, the pyrams and their allies. The species is one of eleven known species within the Boonea genus of gastropods.

Description
The shell grows to a length of approximately 3.5 mm.

Distribution
The vast majority of this marine species is distributed in mostly American waters, these include the following geographical locations:
 Atlantic Ocean: Northeast region of Brazil, Uruguay
 Gulf of Mexico: Florida
 Caribbean Sea: Costa Rica, Panama, Colombia, Suriname

References

 John B. Wise (2001), Anatomy of Boonea jadisi (Olsson & McGinty, 1958) (Heterobranchia, Pyramidellidae) from the Western Atlantic, with comparisons to other species in the genus; The Nautilus 115 (2) 68-75

External links
 To Biodiversity Heritage Library (1 publication)
 To Encyclopedia of Life
 To World Register of Marine Species
 

Pyramidellidae
Gastropods described in 1958